The Canadian Association for Translation Studies (CATS) [fr: Association canadienne de traductologie] is a Canadian non-profit organization that promotes research on translation, writing, terminology, and interpretation. It is a member of the Federation for the Humanities and Social Sciences, an organization that represents Canadian universities and scholarly associations.

History
The Canadian Association for Translation Studies was founded in 1987.

The association has also signed a memorandum of cooperation with the American Translators and Interpreting Studies Association

Mission
The organization's aims stated in its Constitution are to foster research in translation and interpreting, to promote further education for teachers of translation and interpreting, and to offer advice on the training of translators and interpreters. The association hosts an annual conference as part of the Congress of the Humanities and Social Sciences hosted by the Federation for the Humanities and Social Sciences.

Publications
Since 1998, CATS has published a biannual academic journal, TTR, which focuses on translation, terminology and writing. The journal publishes articles in both French and English.

See also
 Translation studies
 Intercultural communication

References

External links
Official Website
Certified Translation

Translation studies
Translation organizations
Translation associations of Canada
Pan-European trade and professional organizations
Professional associations based in Austria
Organizations established in 1993